This is the list of presidents of Campania since the office's creation in 1970.

Until the entry into force of Constitutional Law 1/1999, the President of Campania was elected, like the other members of the executive body of the Region, by the Regional Council, among its members. Since the 2000 regional election, the President of Campania is elected by universal and direct suffrage, appointing and revoking the other members of the junta.

Elected by the Regional Council (1970–1995)

Directly-elected presidents (since 2000)

Government of Campania
Politics of Campania
Campania